Howard Maurice Lawson (22 May 1914 – 21 October 2006) was an English first-class cricketer. Lawson was a right-handed batsman who bowled right-arm fast-medium.

Lawson made his first-class debut for Hampshire in the 1935 County Championship against Essex. Lawson represented Hampshire in 45 first-class matches from 1935 to 1937, with Lawson's final appearance for the county coming against Glamorgan at the County Ground, Southampton in 1937.

In his 45 matches for the county, Lawson scored 560 runs at a batting average of 10.00, with a single half century score of 53 against Essex in 1935. With the ball Lawson took 71 wickets at a bowling average of 36.23, with two five wicket hauls and best bowling figures of 5/91 against Gloucestershire in 1936. In the field Lawson took 18 catches.

In addition to representing Hampshire, Lawson made a single first-class appearance for the Gentlemen in the 1935 Gentlemen v Players fixture.

Lawson died at Worthing, Sussex on 21 October 2006.

Family
Lawson's father Maurice played seven first-class matches for Hampshire.

External links
Howard Lawson at Cricinfo
Howard Lawson at CricketArchive
Matches and detailed statistics for Howard Lawson

1914 births
2006 deaths
Sportspeople from Bournemouth
Cricketers from Dorset
English cricketers
Hampshire cricketers
Gentlemen cricketers